Pontus Robert Conrad von Rosen (21 November 1881 – 11 January 1951) was a Swedish fencer. He competed at the 1908 and 1912 Summer Olympics.

References

External links
 

1881 births
1951 deaths
Swedish male épée fencers
Olympic fencers of Sweden
Fencers at the 1908 Summer Olympics
Fencers at the 1912 Summer Olympics
Sportspeople from Stockholm
20th-century Swedish people